The 1966–67 Yugoslav First League season was the 21st season of the First Federal League, the top level association football league of SFR Yugoslavia, since its establishment in 1946. Sixteen teams contested the competition, with Sarajevo winning their first national title.

Teams
At the end of the previous season Radnički Belgrade and NK Trešnjevka were relegated. They were replaced by Sutjeska and Čelik.

League table

Results

Winning squad

Top scorers

See also
1966–67 Yugoslav Second League
1966–67 Yugoslav Cup

External links
Yugoslavia Domestic Football Full Tables

Yugoslav First League seasons
Yugo
1966–67 in Yugoslav football